Chris "Shockwave" Sullivan is an American actor and vocal percussionist. He is best known as being a regular cast member on the American children's public television show The Electric Company as Shock. His work on the show includes beatboxing. Sullivan was also a producer of the show. He also beatboxed for the Broadway show Freestyle Love Supreme.

Life 
Sullivan is from Foxborough, Massachusetts. He was a communications major at the University of Massachusetts Amherst. He was also an AmeriCorps volunteer in Boston.

References

External links
 Shockwave homepage
 Chris Sullivan on IMDb

Living people
21st-century American male actors
American male television actors
Place of birth missing (living people)
American beatboxers
University of Massachusetts Amherst College of Social and Behavioral Sciences alumni
Male actors from Massachusetts
1980 births